The 1967 All-Ireland Senior Football Championship final was a Gaelic football match played at Croke Park on 24 September 1967 to determine the winners of the 1967 All-Ireland Senior Football Championship, the 81st season of the All-Ireland Senior Football Championship, a tournament organised by the Gaelic Athletic Association for the champions of the four provinces of Ireland. The final was contested by Cork of Munster and Meath of Leinster, with Meath winning by 1-9 to 0-9.

The All-Ireland final between Cork and Meath was a unique occasion as it was the first ever championship meeting between the two teams. Cork were appearing in their first final in over a decade, while Meath were lining out in their second successive All-Ireland decider.

The first half was a dour, tense affair riddled with mistakes. Cork surged ahead into a three-point lead, while Meath only registered one point in the first half after being held scoreless for 27 minutes.

In the second half Meath were a transformed team. In his Irish Times column Paddy Downey wrote: "Their second half transformation was so unexpected that it seems incredible. Nevertheless it was a rally which for grit and guts and spirit surpassed anything I have seen in a final." Six minutes after the restart Terry Kearns slipped unnoticed behind the Cork backline to punch Matt Kerrigan's centre to the net from 5 yards out. Inexperience cost Cork. Their last-minute goal chance was pulled back because Con O'Sullivan's short free to Flor Hayes was deemed too short by the referee.

Meath's All-Ireland victory was their first since 1954. The win gave them their third All-Ireland title over all and put them joint eighth on the all-time roll of honour along with Mayo, Louth and Cork.

Peter McDermott of Meath, also known as "the man in the cap" and a winner of All-Ireland medals with the team in 1949 and 1954, was coach of the 1967-winning team.

Cork's All-Ireland defeat was their third since their last All-Ireland victory in 1945. They previously lost All-Ireland finals in 1956 and 1957.

Meath subsequently toured Australia for some early examples of international rules football. Meath played five Australian state sides and won them all, producing a combined score of 26-43 to 3-29.

Match

Details

References

All-Ireland Senior Football Championship Final
All-Ireland Senior Football Championship Final, 1967
All-Ireland Senior Football Championship Finals
All-Ireland Senior Football Championship Finals
Cork county football team matches
Meath county football team matches